Dani's House is a British children's comedy-drama series broadcast on CBBC and starring Dani Harmer. The first series premiered on 26 September 2008, and its fifth series concluded on 19 July 2012. It has received several awards and nominations from BAFTA Kids. A spin-off called Dani's Castle began airing in 2013. A total of 65 episodes aired over the five series.

Series overview

Episodes

Series 1 (2008)

Series 2 (2009–10)

Series 3 (2010)

Series 4 (2011)

Series 5 (2013)

References 

Lists of British children's television series episodes